The First Wakatsuki Cabinet is the 25th Cabinet of Japan led by Wakatsuki Reijirō from January 30, 1926 to April 20, 1927.

Cabinet

References 

Cabinet of Japan
1926 establishments in Japan
Cabinets established in 1926
Cabinets disestablished in 1927